Gelu Miodrag Velici (born 22 April 1992) is a Romanian footballer who plays as a striker.

References

External links

1992 births
Living people
Sportspeople from Timișoara
Romanian footballers
Association football forwards
Liga I players
Liga II players
CSM Ceahlăul Piatra Neamț players
FC Dinamo București players
CS Național Sebiș players
CSM Deva players
FC Dunărea Călărași players
SSU Politehnica Timișoara players
Cigánd SE players
CSM Reșița players
Romanian expatriate footballers
Romanian expatriate sportspeople in Hungary
Expatriate footballers in Hungary